Heinz Werner Alfred Kaufmann (20 September 1913 – 31 August 1997) was a German rower who competed in the 1936 Summer Olympics.

In 1936, he won the bronze medal as crew member of the coxed eight German boat in the men's eight competition. The German team lost to the American and Italian teams by a second.

A year later, he earned the German national title with the coxed fours, and won the European title as well.

In 1941, he won his last German title with the coxed eights.

References

1913 births
1997 deaths
Olympic rowers of Germany
Rowers at the 1936 Summer Olympics
Olympic bronze medalists for Germany
Olympic medalists in rowing
German male rowers
Medalists at the 1936 Summer Olympics
Rowers from Berlin
European Rowing Championships medalists